is a mountain located in the Saitama Prefecture (Chichibu District), at the northern end of the Okuchichibu Mountains.

References

Mountains of Saitama Prefecture